Sirkka Sari (born Sirkka Linnea Jahnsson, 1 May 1920 – 30 July 1939) was a Finnish actress.

Sirkka died when she fell down a chimney. She was at a party with the rest of the cast and crew of Rikas tyttö, her third and last film, while shooting at the Aulanko Hotel in Hämeenlinna; the party had been her idea. She and one of the men in the group went up to the roof of the hotel; on the flat roof, there was a chimney almost 30 metres high, with a ladder leading up to the top. Sari mistook this chimney for a scenery balcony, climbed up, and fell down inside it into a heating boiler's furnace, where she died instantly of internal injuries and cardiac arrest.

Because of Sari's death, the end of the film had to be altered; the crew shot further away, and so another woman had to replace Sari on these final shots.

Sirkka Sari was buried in the churchyard at Perkjärvi in her native East Karelia. Both the church and the cemetery were destroyed in the Winter War the following year, and the area was thereafter annexed by the Soviet Union. Today the territory is part of Russia, and attempts to locate her grave since the end of the Cold War have so far been unsuccessful.

Filmography
Niskavuoren naiset (1938)
Sysmäläinen (1938)
Rikas tyttö (1939)

See also
 List of unusual deaths

References

External links
 

1920 births
1939 deaths
People from Vyborg District
20th-century Finnish actresses
Accidental deaths from falls
Accidental deaths in Finland